These are the mintage quantities for strikings of the United States nickel.
 P = Philadelphia Mint 
 D = Denver Mint
 S = San Francisco Mint
W = West Point Mint

Parenthesis around the mint mark denotes that the coin does not have a mint mark on the coin, but was minted in that location.

Designs

Shield nickels (1866–1883)

Liberty Head V nickel (1883–1913)

Indian Head (or Buffalo nickel) (1913–1938)

Jefferson Head nickels (1938–present)

Jefferson nickels have been minted since 1938 at the Philadelphia and Denver mints and from the San Francisco mint until 1970. Key dates for the series include the 1939-D, and 1950-D nickels. The 1939-D nickel with a mintage of 3,514,000 coins is the second lowest behind the 1950-D nickel. The cause of the key date of 1939 stems from the new design that excited collectors the year prior, after the initial hype had settled down fewer nickels were saved. 2,630,000 nickels were minted in Denver in 1950, this remains the lowest mintage for the Denver mint in the series. Despite its low mintage the nickel is not rare, its value is thought to be connected to the brilliant uncirculated roll boom that burst between 1963 and 1964. On the opposite spectrum, the year 1964 saw the largest combined mintage of nickels to date. The result of the large mintages were due to a widespread shortage of small change that was blamed on coin collectors. the following year, The Coinage Act of 1965 removed all mint marks from nickels that were issued by the mints, this lasted until 1968 when the mintmark was moved from the reverse to the obverse side of the coin.

See also

United States cent mintage figures
Lincoln cent mintage figures
United States quarter mintage figures
Washington quarter mintage figures
50 State quarter mintage figures
America the Beautiful quarter mintage figures
 Kennedy half dollar mintage figures

References

External links
(United States Mint)